That Metal Show is a talk show that premiered on VH1 Classic on November 15, 2008 and ended on May 9, 2015 with a span of 14 seasons. Hosted by Eddie Trunk, Don Jamieson and Jim Florentine, the series features three hosts interviewing musicians from the hard rock and heavy metal genre in addition to artists and non-musicians who are metal fans while various segments intervene throughout the episode.

VH1 Classic discontinued producing more episodes of That Metal Show on January 19, 2016 due to the network's transition to MTV Classic seven months later.

Recurring segments
 Stump the Trunk
 Pick of the Week (seasons 1–11 & 13–14)
 What's Going On with... (formerly Whatever Happened to...) (seasons 1–11 & 13)
 The Throwdown (seasons 1–11 & 13–14)
 Living the High Life with... (season 3)
 The Rant (seasons 4 & 12)
 TMS Vault (seasons 5–14)
 TMS Top 5 (seasons 6–14)
 TMS Top 4 (season 10)
 Metal Modem (seasons 12–14)
 Take It or Leave It (seasons 12–14)
 Put it On the Table (seasons 12–14)
 On the Shelf (seasons 12–13)
 On the Fringes (seasons 12–13)
 TMS Book Club (seasons 12–13)
 TMS Worldwide (season 12)
 Behind the Music Video (season 12)
 Rock & Roll Landmarks (season 12)
 Origins (season 12)
 Rank (seasons 12–14)
 Underrated (seasons 12–14)
 Take It or Take It (season 13)

Miss Box of Junk Girl
The duties of the Miss Box of Junk Girl are to bring out the prize box for Stump the Trunk and to place choices in order for TMS Top 5.
 Kerri Lee Tucker (seasons 2–3; deceased)
 Jennifer Gottlieb  (seasons 4–14)

Series overview

Episodes

Season 1 (2008)

Season 2 (2009)

Season 3 (2009)
The season premiere kicked off as a one-hour special at the Hard Rock Cafe featuring live performances from Anvil plus Q&A with the band and an appearance from some special guests.

Season 4 (2010)
Keri Leigh Tucker, the first Miss Box of Junk Girl, died in late 2009 and was replaced by Jennifer Gottlieb. A memorial dedicated to Keri Leigh was shown after the end credits to the season premiere. This season also marks the last to be filmed in New York before the show relocated to Los Angeles beginning with Season 5.

Season 5 (2010)
This season marks the first to be filmed at the Sony Pictures Studios in Glendale, California (a suburb of Los Angeles).

Season 6 (2010)
Beginning with Season 6, the show aired as a one-hour format in addition to including a musical guest for each episode.

Season 7 (2011)
Season 7 continued to have a guest guitarist for each episode while introducing a guest bassist.

Season 8 (2011)
The episode featuring guests Michael Sweet, Jani Lane and Taime Downe marked Jani Lane's final appearance as this episode was taped prior to his death on August 11. It was originally scheduled to air on October 1, but was moved to August 27 as the second episode where the episode included a special opening dedicated Lane's memory. In addition, the episode with Stephen Pearcy and Tim "Ripper" Owens now aired as the seventh episode.

Season 9 (2011–12)
The season premiere was filmed during Guns N' Roses' Chinese Democracy Tour at the American Airlines Arena in Miami, FL. Season 9 marked the first season to be presented in widescreen format.

Season 10 (2012)
Season 10 is the first to feature a drummer as a musical guest. According to Eddie Trunk, eight out of the ten episodes were shown while two of them debuted in season 11 after the network revised the schedule. Jason Newsted, who was originally scheduled to appear in the fifth episode, cancelled his appearance at the last minute during the taping and was replaced by the members of Warrant.

Season 11 (2012)
The "David Draiman/Adrenaline Mob" and "Bobby Blotzer/L.A. Guns" episodes were originally going to be included in the previous season after both episodes were taped but were moved to Season 11 after VH1 Classic revised the Season 10 schedule. The TMS marathon premiered the season premiere as a sneak preview ahead of its August 11 premiere.

Season 12 (2013)
Several new segments were introduced with only two "Top 5" lists being debated in the series. Another new inclusion to the show is an announcer for the opening credits as well as surprise special guests appearing via satellite to chat with the hosts in the new segment "Metal Modem". This is the last season to be taped in Los Angeles before returning to New York in Season 13. Season 12 was also the only season to include the round table format.

Season 13 (2014)
It was announced that season 13 will be moved to New York for the first time since season 4 with episodes being taped every Tuesday at the Metropolis Studio for 12 weeks except for the last two episodes that were both filmed on the same day. This season also marks the return of "The Throwdown", "Pick of the Week" and "What Going On With..." after they were absent in season 12. Ace Frehley was originally supposed to appear on the same episode as Peter Criss but was unable to make it.

Season 14 (2015)
Season 14 premiered on February 21, 2015 in their new timeslot at 9/8c with a repeat airing in their former 11/10c slot. All the episodes were once again filmed on Tuesday nights at the Metropolis Studios in New York City while episodes 9 and 10 were shot back-to-back. A special last-minute tribute to Twisted Sister drummer A.J. Pero, who died a week earlier on March 20, was included in the sixth episode along with an appearance by his bandmates. Despite Trunk telling the audience at the end of the season, now series finale, "We'll see you next season on That Metal Show", Season 14 proved to be the show's final season after VH1 Classic announced its decision not to renew the show for a 15th season in January 2016 a year after the airing and before the network's re-branding to MTV Classic in August of that year.

Specials

References

External links
 That Metal Show at VH1.com
 That Metal Show Blog

2000s American television talk shows
2010s American television talk shows
VH1 original programming
Heavy metal television series
Rock music television series
2008 American television series debuts
2015 American television series endings
2000s American music television series
2010s American music television series
English-language television shows
2000s American black comedy television series
2010s American black comedy television series